Vreteno or Rintam is the second studio album by Serbian singer-songwriter Željko Joksimović. It was released in 2001 by City Records in Serbia and Montenegro and most countries from Yugoslavia.

Track listing

Release history

References

2001 albums
Željko Joksimović albums